Amodu Tijani v Secretary, Southern Nigeria [1921] 2 AC 399, [1921] UKPC 80, also known as the Apapa land case, was a decision of the Judicial Committee of the Privy Council concerning land title.

Background and lower courts 
The controversy at issue in the case arose in 1913, when the colonial government of Nigeria appropriated land in Apapa, pursuant to the Public Land (Acquisition) Ordinance 1903, in order to give it to European merchants. The land was occupied by the Oluwa chiefly family of Lagos, under the leadership of Amodu Tijani. Tijani argued before the Nigerian courts that he was owed compensation for the expropriation, because the land belonged to him personally. His claim was unsuccessful.

Privy Council 
The Privy Council, reversing the judgments below, held that although the territory of the Lagos Colony had been ceded to the imperial Crown in 1861 under the Lagos Treaty of Cession and the Crown thereby acquired allodial title to the land, the Crown held only a "limited right of administrative interference" with the land and was required to pay compensation for using it. Tijani, as the leader of the community living on the land, held usufructuary rights on the community's behalf. The Privy Council's decision established that land rights at customary law could be enforced by imperial courts. Kent McNeil argues that Tijani follows a presumption that property rights at private law continue in force despite a change in sovereign control over territory.

Ben Silverstein calls Tijani "perhaps the most important of the Privy Council's decisions on native title".

See also  
 Calder v British Columbia (Attorney General)
 Delgamuukw v British Columbia
 Mabo v Queensland (No 2)
 Sagong Tasi

References

Sources

External links 
 

1921 in Nigeria
Judicial Committee of the Privy Council cases
Law of Nigeria